EE Pegasi is a variable triple star system in the northern constellation Pegasus. It is too faint to be readily visible to the naked eye with a combined apparent visual magnitude of 6.96. The system is located at a distance of approximately 472 light years from the Sun based on Parallax, but is drifting closer with a radial velocity of −23 km/s.

This system was found to be an eclipsing binary by German astronomer Cuno Hoffmeister in 1935, and has since been the subject of multiple studies. The pair orbit each other closely with a period of 2.628 days. The magnitude 7.09 primary, component A, is an Am star with a stellar classification of A3m. It has more than double the mass and radius of the Sun. The secondary companion, component B, is an F-type main-sequence star with a class of F5V and a visual magnitude of 9.40. A third component is a smaller orange or red dwarf that orbits the main pair every .

References

A-type giants
F-type main-sequence stars
Triple star systems
Algol variables
Pegasus (constellation)
Durchmusterung objects
206155
106981
Pegasi, EE